ROHN Products, LLC, formerly ROHN Industries, Inc. and UNR Industries, Inc., is a manufacturer of telecommunications towers, poles, utility structures, mounts, and other materials. ROHN products include support structures for antennae, private microwave, cellular telephone, personal communications systems, commercial broadcasting, and amateur radio.

History 

ROHN Manufacturing was founded in 1948 by Dwight Rohn, who at the time was manager of the Peoria Airport. The first tower he built was for airport use. ROHN first began producing antenna towers for home television reception, and subsequently expanded its product line to include the manufacturing of telecommunication towers and other communication products, including broadcast towers of up to 2,000 feet high. ROHN towers have been installed all over the world.

The company was family-owned until it was sold to UNARCO Industries in the 1971. UNARCO Industries, Inc. declared bankruptcy in 1982 and was reorganized as UNR Industries, Inc., later changing the name to ROHN Industries, Inc. In 2003, ROHN Industries, Inc. was acquired by Radian Corporation and in 2008 ROHN Products, LLC became independent again. In 2008, ROHN Products, LLC was acquired by O'Brien Steel Service Co.

References

External links 
 Official website
 Radian Acquisition of Rohn Industries
 Historical SEC data for Rohn Industries 2001.
 Slowing of American Metals Market (data) in 1998.
 Impact of 1989 IRS tax rulings on UNR Industries.
 Oversight hearing on the effect of the Manville and UNR bankruptcies on compensation of asbestos victims.

Amateur radio companies
Manufacturing companies based in Illinois